Naalum Therindhavan is a 1968 Indian Tamil-language comedy film co-produced, co-edited and directed by C. P. Jambulingam and written by Guhanathan. The film stars Ravichandran and Kanchana. It was released on 12 December 1968.

Plot

Cast 
 Ravichandran
 Kanchana
Nagesh
R. S. Manohar
V. K. Ramasamy
S. A. Ashokan
M. R. R. Vasu
 Anjali Devi
Pandari Bai
 Renu
 Vijaysri

Production 
Naalum Therindhavan was directed by C. P. Jambulingam using the diminutive "Jambu". He co-produced the film with K. V. Kamalanabham and K. T. S. Karuppiah under Sri Balaji Combines, and co-edited it with C. P. S. Mani, while Guhanathan wrote the script.

Soundtrack 
The soundtrack was composed by S. M. Subbaiah Naidu.

Release and reception 
Naalum Therindhavan was released on 12 December 1968. The Indian Express wrote, "There is a sequence and an important one that takes place in complete darkness. All one can hear is the noise of characters running about and stumbling over things. Spectators are puzzled as to what is happening on the screen during these minutes. And they are equally puzzled at what is shown in sparkling brightness for they can't make head or tail out of this mumbo-jumbo (or Jambu-he is the director), running to 16 reels."

References

External links 
 

1960s Tamil-language films
1968 comedy films
Films scored by S. M. Subbaiah Naidu
Indian comedy films